USS Healy may refer to the following ships of the United States Navy:

 , a Fletcher-class destroyer launched in 1943 and struck in 1974

See also
 , a research icebreaker commissioned in 1999

United States Navy ship names